These are the Canadian number-one albums of 2012. The chart is compiled by Nielsen Soundscan and published by Jam! Canoe, issued every Sunday. The chart also appears in Billboard magazine as Top Canadian Albums.

Chart history

See also
List of Canadian Hot 100 number-one singles of 2012
List of number-one digital songs of 2012 (Canada)

References

External links
Top 100 albums in Canada on Jam
Billboard Top Canadian Albums

2012
Canada Albums
2012 in Canadian music